Balkrishan Singh (10 March 1933 – 31 December 2004) was a field hockey player from India who won the gold medal at the 1956 Summer Olympics.

Balkrishan Singh is perhaps the only player in the country to have won the gold medal both as a player and as a coach. He was a member of the gold medal-winning team in the 1956 Olympics and was chief coach of the team that won the gold in the 1980 Moscow Olympics.

Balkrishan went to Australia in 1965 to train the women's national squad. Australian Prime Minister Malcolm Fraser was so impressed with him that he went on record praising Balkrishan Singh's coaching abilities.

He was the first coach to experiment with the concept of total hockey in India. He first put this concept into use during the 1992 Barcelona Olympics. Total hockey, in his view, was hockey which should be played like basketball – attack together and defend together.

He is hockey's first ever player-coach. In him one could easily traverse through the vicissitude of Independent India's hockey history. More so, the twice Olympic medallist (1956 gold, 1960 silver) is the lone Olympian to coach four Olympic teams.

His father, Brigadier Dalip Singh (long jumper in 1924 and 1928 Olympics) when put his ward in the F.C College, Lahore said, "You should commanded respect in the college as I did in sports here". Balkrishan lived up to his father's words – excelled in athletics and hockey.

Balkrishan made his international debut in the Hockey Festival at Warsaw, Poland in 1955.

At Melbourne Olympics, the defender was a picture of confidence, evoking awe in the rival forwards. He played all matches except the Pakistan final. So enamoured were the Australians by his flawless tactics that he almost emerged a cult figure in later years.

Two years later, his ambition of playing against Pakistan was fulfilled at Tokyo Asian Games. The match ended in a goal-less draw, thank the defender Balkrishan, though Pakistan was declared winner on the basis of goal average. At 1960 Rome Olympics also Pakistan became the champion. Those two defeats shook the soul of Balkrishan.

This was a time for introspection. Inspired by the personality of the chief coach Dhyan Chand, Balkrishan joined a coaching course at NIS, Patiala, and topped it with 93 percent marks. He spent rest of his life in innovating hockey.

In 1967, Balkrishan spent about five months in Australia, imparting hockey knowledge. Prime Minister of Australia, Malcolm Fraser, a hockey umpire, praised Balkrishan's services when he met his counterpart Morarji Desai later.

Balkrishan, 35, coached the 1968 Mexico Olympic team for a bronze medal.

His boys won the gold at the Moscow Olympics. He was recalled for the next Olympics only after India fared poorly in the Bombay World Cup and in the Delhi Asian Games in between. Meanwhile, he put together a girls' team for the Delhi Asian Games—they won it!

In the run up to the 1992 Barcelona Olympics, his team set up a tremendous record, but the players' greed and lack of discipline spoilt the whole show at Barcelona—a sad end to an illustrious career.

But his efforts in giving India a meaningful coaching perspective cannot be denied. Had he ever been given a four-year tenure, the history of Indian hockey would not have been as discouraging as it is now.

Based on his research, Balkrishan proposed abolition of penalty corners and striking circle in order to make the game simple. He welcomed the introduction of artificial playing surfaces. He was the first Indian coach to adopt the 4-4-2-1 style. He metamorphosed the unique Indian traits in the concept of total hockey which earned him many laurels in the 80s.

References

External links
Obituary

1933 births
2004 deaths
Sportspeople from Patiala
Field hockey players from Punjab, India
Olympic field hockey players of India
Olympic gold medalists for India
Field hockey players at the 1956 Summer Olympics
Indian male field hockey players
Recipients of the Arjuna Award
Olympic medalists in field hockey
Asian Games medalists in field hockey
Field hockey players at the 1958 Asian Games
Medalists at the 1956 Summer Olympics
Asian Games silver medalists for India
Medalists at the 1958 Asian Games
Indian field hockey coaches